The Malibu Stakes is a race for three-year-old thoroughbred horses of either gender held each December at Santa Anita Park in Arcadia, California. The race is at a distance of seven furlongs'' and is the first leg of Santa Anita Park's Strub Series.

A Grade I event currently with a $300,000 purse, it has attracted some of America's best horses following the Breeders' Cup.

Inaugurated in 1952 as the Malibu Sequet Stakes, its name was changed to the present style in 1958.

There was a Malibu Stakes run in January and December of the same year in 1955, 1960, 1966, and 1984. It was run in two divisions in 1972, 1975, 1977, 1981, and 1984.

There was no race in 1959, 1964, 1967, 1970.

Records
Speed record:
 1:19.70 – Twirling Candy (2010)

Most wins by a jockey:
 8 – Bill Shoemaker (1957, 1961, 1968, 1972, 1977 (2), 1980, 1986)

Most wins by a trainer:
 6 – Richard Mandella (1988, 1995, 2000, 2004, 2012, 2019)

Most wins by an owner:
 2 – Andrew J. Crevolin (1954, 1955)
 2 – Juddmonte Farms (2001, 2006)

Winners

References
 The Malibu Stakes at Pedigree Query
 The 2007 Malibu Stakes at the NTRA

Horse races in California
Santa Anita Park
Flat horse races for three-year-olds
Grade 1 stakes races in the United States
Recurring sporting events established in 1952
1952 establishments in California